Dorothy Metzger Habel is an American historian of Ancient Roman art, currently a Distinguished Professor at the University of Tennessee.

References

University of Tennessee faculty
21st-century American historians
Year of birth missing (living people)
Living people